Diplectroninae is a subfamily level taxon consisting of net-spinning caddisflies. The subfamily was described by Georg Ulmer in 1951.

References 

Trichoptera subfamilies